Abingdon was a rural district in the administrative county of Berkshire from 1894 to 1974.

It was formed under the Local Government Act 1894 based on that part of the Abingdon rural sanitary district which was in Berkshire (the Oxfordshire part forming Culham Rural District). It nearly surrounded, but did not include, the municipal borough of Abingdon, and in the north was close to Oxford.

The district was governed locally by the Abingdon Rural District Council which, in the 1960s, consisted of 35 members. The offices of the council were in Bath Street, Abingdon.

It was abolished in 1974 under the Local Government Act 1972, and merged with other districts to form the new Vale of White Horse, which was in the new non-metropolitan county of Oxfordshire.

Civil parishes
The district contained the following civil parishes during its existence:

References

http://www.visionofbritain.org.uk/unit_page.jsp?u_id=10135140

Rural District
Districts of England abolished by the Local Government Act 1972
Former districts of Berkshire
Districts of England created by the Local Government Act 1894
Rural districts of England
History of Oxfordshire